Alternative Trap is the debut mixtape by American hip hop recording artist Lucki, released on July 25, 2013 as a free digital download.

Track listing

2013 mixtape albums
Debut mixtape albums
Lucki albums